Charles George Bonner  (29 December 1884 – 7 February 1951) was an English recipient of the Victoria Cross, the highest award for gallantry in the face of the enemy that can be awarded to British and Commonwealth forces.

The lieutenant was in the thick of the fighting and throughout the whole of the action his pluck and determination had a considerable influence on the crew. For his actions, Bonner was awarded the Victoria Cross. Ernest Herbert Pitcher also received the Victoria Cross for his involvement.

He later achieved the rank of captain in the Merchant Navy.

Memorials
Bonner, who died at home in Edinburgh in 1951 aged 66, was cremated at Warriston Crematorium.  His ashes were buried in St Mary's Churchyard, Aldridge, his birthplace, in the West Midlands.

In November 2007, a commemorative plaque to Captain Bonner was unveiled in Aldridge, where his life, bravery and achievements are specifically celebrated in the annual Remembrance Day parade.

In December 2009, a memorial plaque to Bonner and two other recipients of the Victoria Cross, James Thompson and John Henry Carless, was unveiled at the Town Hall in Walsall, England.

References

Monuments to Courage (David Harvey, 1999)
The Register of the Victoria Cross (This England, 1997)
VCs of the First World War - The Naval VCs (Stephen Snelling, 2002)

External links
Location of grave and VC medal (Staffordshire)

1884 births
1951 deaths
British World War I recipients of the Victoria Cross
Recipients of the Distinguished Service Cross (United Kingdom)
Royal Navy recipients of the Victoria Cross
Royal Navy officers of World War I
People from the Borough of North Warwickshire
Royal Naval Reserve personnel
Royal Navy officers
Military personnel from Warwickshire